Armando Alberto Benedetti Villaneda (born 29 August 1967) is a Colombian politician. He served as Senator of Colombia from 2006 to 2022 and Member of the Chamber of Representatives of Colombia from 2002 to 2006.

Career
Benedetti attended the Pontifical Xavierian University, and graduated with a degree in communication studies. He briefly worked as a reporter for Noticiero QAP between 1990 and 1991, and later served as political adviser to Eduardo Verano de la Rosa during the 1991 Constituent Assembly. He served as Secretary General of Public Establishments of the National Traffic and Transport Institute (Intra) between 1992 and 1993, and was later appointed deputy director of the Colombia Health Resource Company (Ecosalud), serving from 1996 to 1997.

In 1998, Benedetti was elected to the Bogotá City Council as a Liberal party candidate, and head of his electoral list. He served as Council Member until 2000, when he decided not to seek re-election in order to run for Congress.

During the 2002 parliamentary elections, Benedetti ran for a seat in the Chamber of Representatives for the circumscription of the Capital District as a Liberal candidate and head of his electoral list. He won with 31,855 votes.

Senator
In 2006, Benedetti decided to run in the 2006 parliamentary elections, this time for a seat in the Senate, and this time as a Social Party of National Unity candidate. He won a seat in the national elections with 50,356 votes.

In 2010, Benedetti was re-elected to the Senate with 81,029 votes, On 20 July 2010, Benedetti was elected by his peers President of the Senate. As President of the Senate, Benedetti administered the oath of office to President Juan Manuel Santos Calderón when he took office the following month on 7 August.

Personal life
Armando Alberto was born on 29 August 1967 in Barranquilla, Colombia, to Armando Benedetti Jimeno and Genoveva Villaneda Jiménez. His sister Ángela María is the current Ambassador of Colombia to Panama.

References

External links

1967 births
Living people
People from Barranquilla
Colombian people of Italian descent
Pontifical Xavierian University alumni
Colombian journalists
Male journalists
Members of the Chamber of Representatives of Colombia
Members of the Senate of Colombia
Presidents of the Senate of Colombia
Social Party of National Unity politicians
Colombian LGBT rights activists
Ambassadors of Colombia to Venezuela